Pinnawala South Grama Niladhari Division is a Grama Niladhari Division of the Padukka Divisional Secretariat of Colombo District of Western Province, Sri Lanka. It has Grama Niladhari Division Code 456A.

Pinnawala South is a surrounded by the Pinnawala North, Uggalla, Elamalawala, Waga North, Waga West, Neluwattuduwa and Kahahena Grama Niladhari Divisions.

Demographics

Ethnicity 

The Pinnawala South Grama Niladhari Division has a Sinhalese majority (99.4%). In comparison, the Padukka Divisional Secretariat (which contains the Pinnawala South Grama Niladhari Division) has a Sinhalese majority (95.8%)

Religion 

The Pinnawala South Grama Niladhari Division has a Buddhist majority (98.4%). In comparison, the Padukka Divisional Secretariat (which contains the Pinnawala South Grama Niladhari Division) has a Buddhist majority (94.6%)

References 

Grama Niladhari Divisions of Padukka Divisional Secretariat